Irish League may refer to:

Sport

Former name of the Northern Ireland Football League, the national association football league of Northern Ireland
Irish League representative team
League of Ireland, the national association football league of the Republic of Ireland
Irish Elite League, in rugby league
Irish Baseball League

Politics

 Irish National Land League, a political organization active from 1879 to 1882
 Irish League (or L'Association Irlandaise) founded by Maud Gonne in 1896
 United Irish League, a nationalist political party founded in 1898 and active until the early 1920s
Irish Dominion League
Irish Self-Determination League

See also
 Gaelic League, a social and cultural organisation which promotes the Irish language